Ullim Falls  ( 울림 폭포 ) is a waterfall located outside of Wŏnsan, North Korea.

History

According to the Korean Friendship Association, the Ullim Falls were developed by Kim Jong-il in 1999, with a resort completed in 2001. It has been marked by the North Korean government as a tourist destination.

Commemoration

The falls featured on two North Korean stamps: in the 2005 "Landscapes" series, and the 2017 "Autumn Landscapes" series.

Notes

References

Landforms of North Korea
Tourism in North Korea
Waterfalls of Asia